Mary Strange Reeve (9 January 189128 March 1974) was an English miniaturist, book illustrator, and commercial artist. Her most lasting work is probably her illustrations for girls' school stories.

Biography
Mary Strange Reeve was born at Walthamstow, Essex on 9 January 1891. Her father, Gilfrid Reeve, was a Brewer's Clerk, rising to the position of Brewer's Managing Clerk by 1911. Her mother was Alice Margaret Strange. Reeve was the third child of six.

Reeve married Walter Deveson Reynolds  (8 November 18862 April 1980) on 26 September 1931, at Saints Peter and Paul's Church in Chingford.

In 1939 Reeve was living with her husband at Pemberley, 82 Tycehurst Hill, Loughton, Essex. She was still living at that address when she died on 28 March 1974, leaving an estate valued at £47,187. Her husband survived here by six years and was still living at Pemberley when he died on 2 April 1980. His estate was valued at &78,298.

Works

Reeve exhibited seven works at the Royal Academy between 1917 and 1926. She was on the staff of the Oxford University Press.

The following bibliography is based on a search on the Jisc Library Hub Discover databse. supported by other sources (as indicated). It does not include the annuals, such as Mrs. Strang's Annual for girls which Reeve also illustrated.

Further reading
The Spring 2017 issue of Studies in Illustration contained an article on Mary Strange Reeve by William Connelly.

Notes

References

External links

1891 births
1974 deaths
20th-century English painters
20th-century English women artists
British women illustrators
English women painters
People from Walthamstow